Workplace Fairness is a 501(c)(3) public education and advocacy organization, founded in 1994 as the National Employee Rights Institute. According to its mission statement, the organization "believes that fair treatment of workers is sound public policy and good business practice, and that free access to comprehensive, unbiased information about workers' rights" is essential. 

In 2004 PC Magazine named Workplace Fairness's website as one of the "100 Top Websites You Didn't Know You Couldn't Live Without". The website features articles on employment law issues, including overtime, discrimination, retaliation, privacy and whistleblower rights. "Today's Workplace", the Workplace Fairness blog, features daily updates on employee rights and fairness issues. According to the blog, Forbes magazine listed it as one of the "Best of the Web" in 2005.

Workplace Fairness publishes books on the rights of federal employees in the United States and the Employee Rights and Employment Policy Journal.

Products

Employment Attorney Directory 
Workplace Fairness’ employment attorney directory is the highest-ranking directory in Google for employee rights attorneys. Workplace Fairness provides a free basic listing, appearing on the Workplace Fairness website, to all lawyers who represent workers and are working to make the workplace more fair. Attorney listing includes firm's contact information, a link to firm's website, and up to five areas of employment law concentration.

Premium Lawyer Listings 
A premium listing includes priority placement, a dedicated landing page, firm and attorney profiles, a photo or logo, a Google map of firms office, and mobile-friendly links to contact firm directly from listing.

Website Content 
A firm's existing website can receive the Employee Rights and Information Center and weekly content widget, with the latest topical workplace content. The site will feature fresh daily content--a topic of the week, blogs, news articles, and more of the latest information. This daily content will complement hundreds of pages of legal information provided by the award-winning Workplace Fairness website.

Website Building & Editing 
Workplace Fairness builds and edit website content already built in. Firms can choose from several mobile-friendly designs and leave the updates to Workplace Fairness.

References

External links
Workplace Fairness Website
Today's Workplace Blog
Labour law
Labor in the United States
Workers' rights organizations
Non-profit organizations based in the United States
Organizations established in 1994